= J. Christopher Hepburn =

American earth and environmental scientist

J. Christopher Hepburn is an American earth and environmental scientist currently Professor Emeritus, focused in regional geology and tectonics, metamorphic and igneous petrology, and geochemistry, at Boston College and an Elected Fellow of the American Association for the Advancement of Science. He earned his PhD from Harvard University.
